Piscu (Romanian for "the peak") starts off the names of several places in Romania:

Piscu, Galați County
Piscu, Ilfov County
Piscu Corbului
Piscu Lung
Piscu Mare
Piscu Nou
Piscu Pietrei
Piscu Radului
Piscu Reghiului
Piscu Rusului
Piscu Sadovei
Piscu Scoarţei
Piscu Vechi